Skoglund is a surname which originated in Norway and Sweden.  Skoglund may refer to:

Albin Skoglund (born 1997), Swedish footballer
Alexandra Skoglund (1862–1938), Swedish politician, suffragette and women's rights activist
Andreas Skoglund (born 2001) Norwegian Nordic combined skier
Ann-Louise Skoglund (born 1962), Swedish retired track and field hurdler 
Bob Skoglund  (1925–1949), American football defensive end
Bosse Skoglund (Bo Åke Skoglund, 1936–2021),  Swedish musician
Carl Skoglund  (1884–1960), Swedish-American socialist
Eric Skoglund (born 1992), American baseball player
Erik Skoglund (1903–1984), Swedish swimmer
Erik Skoglund (born 1991), Swedish boxer
Evert Skoglund (born 1953), Italian former footballer
Gösta Skoglund (1903–1988), Swedish social democrat politician
Gunnar Skoglund (1899–1983), Swedish film director, editor and screenwriter
John Anders Skoglund (born 1971), Norwegian retired footballer (striker)
Karl-Evert Skoglund, ("Ya", born 1938), Swedish former footballer
Kenneth Skoglund (born 1953), Norwegian sport shooter
Kim Skoglund (born 1987), Swedish footballer
Klara Amalie Skoglund  (1891–1978), Norwegian politician for the Labour Party
Lars Skoglund (born 1974), Norwegian composer and musician
Lennart Skoglund  ("Nacka", 1929–1975), Swedish footballer
Marilyn Skoglund (born 1946), American former judge
Martin Skoglund ("Doverstorparen", 1892–1976), Swedish politician
Mikael Skoglund (born 1969), Swedish academic
Nils Skoglund (1906–1980), Swedish diver who competed in the 1920 Summer Olympics 
Pete Skoglund (1905–1968), New Zealand lawn bowls competitor and brother of Philip Skoglund
Phil Skoglund (1937–2015), New Zealand lawn bowls competitor and son of Philip Skoglund
Philip Skoglund  (1899–1975), New Zealand politician of the Labour Party and a cabinet minister 
Pontus Skoglund (born 1984), Swedish population geneticist
Rolf Skoglund (1940–2022), Swedish actor
Sandy Skoglund (born 1946), American photographer and installation artist
Sunniva Skoglund (born 2002), Norwegian footballer
Thomas Skoglund (born 1983), Norwegian handball player
Vincent Skoglund (born 1974), Swedish photographer
Wes Skoglund (born 1945), American politician serving in Minnesota

Swedish-language surnames
Norwegian-language surnames